Childs may refer to:

People
Childs (surname)
Childs Frick (1883–1965), paleontologist and son of Henry Clay Frick

Places
Childs Hill, an area of London, UK
Childs, Maryland, an unincorporated location
Childs, Minnesota, a former town
Childs, West Virginia

Other uses
 USS Childs (DD-241)
 Childs Restaurants
 Childs v Desormeaux, the leading Supreme Court of Canada on social host liability for drunkenness
 Childs Hall at Whiteknights Park, a campus of the University of Reading, England

See also
 USS A. Childs
 Child
 Child (surname)
 Childe
 Child's (disambiguation)